Vidyavihar is a small suburb of Mumbai. It has a railway station with the same name on the Mumbai suburban railway on the Central Railway line. The area consists of mainly the Somaiya Vidyavihar campus and a few residential buildings.

Vidyavihar station has two platforms, which are generally crowded during college hours. Lokmanya Tilak Terminus falls very near to the station.

Transport 
Roadways

Commuters travel through public transport, i.e. bus, auto-rickshaw, taxi, etc.

Railways

Vidyavihar station falls on the central railway line, on which local trains run between CST & Karjat or Khopoli.

References

Suburbs of Mumbai